Yvette Monreal  is an American actress. she is known for her work as Senna Galan in Matador (2014), Reagan in MTV's Faking It (2014), and Yolanda Montez/Wildcat in The CW’s Stargirl (2020). She also appears in the action film Rambo: Last Blood as John Rambo's caretaker's granddaughter.

Early life
Monreal grew up in London, California. She became interested in acting after taking drama classes in high school. She feels that her mother inspired her to make this decision. Monreal is of half Chilean and half Mexican descent. As a child, she had enjoyed Halle Berry playing Catwoman and wanted to be like her. She has said her upbringing was "very Catholic".

Filmography

Film

Television

Accolades

References

External links

Living people
American television actresses
Place of birth missing (living people)
American film actresses
21st-century American actresses
American people of Chilean descent
American actresses of Mexican descent
Hispanic and Latino American actresses
1992 births